Stefan Späni (born 17 February 1966) is a Swiss former skier. He competed in the Nordic combined event at the 1988 Winter Olympics.

References

External links
 

1966 births
Living people
Swiss male Nordic combined skiers
Olympic Nordic combined skiers of Switzerland
Nordic combined skiers at the 1988 Winter Olympics
People from Winterthur
Sportspeople from the canton of Zürich